The 2022–23 American Athletic Conference men's basketball season began with practices in October 2022, followed by the start of the 2022–23 NCAA Division I men's basketball season on November 7, 2022. Conference play will begin December 27, 2022, and will conclude with the 2023 American Athletic Conference men's basketball tournament, held March 9–12, 2023, at Dickies Arena in Fort Worth, Texas.

Scheduling stayed in the current format: an 18-game schedule in which every team in The American played eight of its 10 conference opponents twice and the other two opponents once—one at home and one on the road.

Previous season
Houston won the regular season championship. The 2022 American Athletic Conference men's basketball tournament was held at Dickies Arena in Fort Worth, Texas, where it was also won by Houston.  Houston and Memphis received bids to the NCAA tournament. Memphis lost in the second round to Gonzaga, while Houston advanced to the Elite Eight before losing to Villanova. The conference finished 4–2 overall. SMU received a bid to the 2022 National Invitation Tournament. SMU lost to Washington State in the second round. The conference went 1–1 overall in the NIT.

Kendric Davis from SMU was named the AAC Player of the Year. Houston's Kelvin Sampson was named Coach of the Year.

Coaches

Coaching changes

Head coaches
Note: Stats are through the beginning of the season. All stats and records are from time at current school only. 

Notes:
 Overall and AAC records are from time at current school and are through the end of 2021–22 season. NCAA records include time at current school only.
 AAC records only, prior conference records not included.
*In current job

Preseason

Recruiting classes

Preseason watchlists
Below is a table of notable preseason watch lists.

Preseason media poll
On October 12, The American released the preseason Poll and other preseason awards.

Preseason All-AAC

Regular season

Conference matrix
This table summarizes the head-to-head results between teams in conference play.

Player of the week
Throughout the regular season, the American Athletic Conference named a player and rookie of the week.

All-AAC Awards and teams

Source:

Postseason

American Athletic Conference tournament

NCAA tournament

National Invitation tournament

NBA draft
The following list includes all AAC players who were drafted in the 2023 NBA draft.

References

2022–23 season